Juniperus flaccida (drooping juniper, weeping juniper or Mexican juniper; Native American names include tláscal) is a large shrub or small tree reaching  (rarely to 15 m) tall. It is native to central and northern Mexico (from Oaxaca northward) and the extreme southwest of Texas, United States (Brewster County).

The bark is brown, with stringy vertical fissuring. The shoots are strongly pendulous, 1–1.2 mm diameter, and often borne in flattened sprays (the only juniper commonly showing this character). The leaves are arranged in opposite decussate pairs; the adult leaves are scale-like, 2–4 mm long (to 7 mm on lead shoots) and 1–1.5 mm broad. The juvenile leaves (on young seedlings only) are needle-like, 5–10 mm long. The cones are berry-like, 8–20 mm in diameter, green maturing brown, and contain 6-12 seeds (the most seeds per cone of any juniper); they are mature in about 18 months. The male cones are 3–5 mm long, and shed their pollen in spring. It is largely dioecious, producing cones of only one sex on each tree.

There are three varieties, not accepted as distinct by all authorities:
Juniperus flaccida var. flaccida. Throughout the range of the species. Cones 9–15 mm diameter, with inconspicuous scale margins.
Juniperus flaccida var. martinezii. Restricted to a small area in Jalisco. Cones 6–8 mm diameter, with inconspicuous scale margins.
Juniperus flaccida var. poblana. Throughout the southern two thirds of the range of the species. Cones 12–20 mm diameter, with conspicuous scale margins.

References

External links
 
 
Adams, R. P. (2004). Junipers of the World: The genus Juniperus. Trafford Publishing 
Gymnosperm Database: Juniperus flaccida
Flora of North America: Juniperus flaccida

flaccida
Trees of Northeastern Mexico
Trees of Northwestern Mexico
Trees of the South-Central United States
Trees of Chiapas
Trees of Durango
Trees of Guerrero
Trees of Michoacán
Trees of Oaxaca
Trees of Puebla
Least concern plants
Dioecious plants
Flora of the Sierra Madre Occidental
Flora of the Sierra Madre Oriental
Flora of the Sierra Madre del Sur
Flora of the Trans-Mexican Volcanic Belt